The 2014 ITF Women's Circuit – Xi'an was a professional tennis tournament played on outdoor hard courts. It was the first edition of the tournament which was part of the 2014 ITF Women's Circuit, offering a total of $50,000 in prize money. It took place in Xi'an, China, on 23–29 June 2014.

Singles main draw entrants

Seeds 

 1 Rankings as of 16 June 2014

Other entrants 
The following players received wildcards into the singles main draw:
  Liu Mingyang
  You Xiaodi
  Zhang Ling
  Zhu Lin

The following players received entry from the qualifying draw:
  Tian Ran
  Xun Fangying
  Yang Zhaoxuan
  Zhang Kailin

Champions

Singles 

  Duan Yingying def.  Zhu Lin 4–6, 7–6(11–9), 6–4

Doubles 

  Lu Jiajing /  Wang Yafan def.  Liang Chen /  Yang Zhaoxuan 6–3, 7–6(7–2)

External links 
 2014 ITF Women's Circuit – Xi'an at ITFtennis.com

Xi'an
Hard court tennis tournaments
Tennis tournaments in China
2014 in Chinese tennis